Jonathan Girard (born May 27, 1980) is a Canadian former professional ice hockey player, who played for the Boston Bruins of the NHL.  Girard was born in Rawdon, Quebec and raised in Joliette, Quebec.

Playing career
As a youth, Girard played in the 1993 and 1994 Quebec International Pee-Wee Hockey Tournaments with the Sélects-du-Nord minor ice hockey team.

A defenceman, Girard played junior hockey for the Laval Titan Collège Français (later the Acadie-Bathurst Titan) of the QMJHL and was drafted in the second round, 48th overall, by the Bruins in 1998).

He played 150 games over five seasons with Boston, scoring 10 goals and recording 34 assists.  He also spent time with the Moncton Wildcats of the QMJHL and the Providence Bruins, Boston's AHL affiliate.

On July 24, 2003, Girard was driving near his hometown in Quebec when he lost control of his car and it flipped over. Girard required surgery for a broken pelvis.  While at the time it was not known if Girard would ever play hockey again, he showed tremendous resilience in returning to skating at the Bruins' practice facility in Wilmington, Massachusetts in March, 2004. However, the loss of the 2004–05 NHL season due to a lockout nullified his attempt at a return to hockey that year.

Girard signed a one year contract with the Bruins on August 10, 2005, and played one game with Providence in the AHL on October 15, 2005.  On November 30, Girard announced his decision to retire, having fully recovered from his injuries but unable to play professional hockey again.

Career statistics

References

External links

1980 births
Acadie–Bathurst Titan players
Boston Bruins draft picks
Boston Bruins players
Canadian ice hockey defencemen
Ice hockey people from Quebec
Laval Titan Collège Français players
Living people
Moncton Wildcats players
People from Joliette
Providence Bruins players